The Revolutions of 1848, known in some countries as the Springtime of the Peoples or the Springtime of Nations, were a series of political upheavals throughout Europe starting in 1848. It remains the most widespread revolutionary wave in European history to date.

The revolutions were essentially democratic and liberal in nature, with the aim of removing the old monarchical structures and creating independent nation-states, as envisioned by romantic nationalism. The revolutions spread across Europe after an initial revolution began in France in February. Over 50 countries were affected, but with no significant coordination or cooperation among their respective revolutionaries. Some of the major contributing factors were widespread dissatisfaction with political leadership, demands for more participation in government and democracy, demands for freedom of the press, other demands made by the working class for economic rights, the upsurge of nationalism, the regrouping of established government forces, and the European Potato Failure, which triggered mass starvation, migration, and civil unrest.

The uprisings were led by temporary coalitions of reformers, the middle classes, the upper classes (the bourgeoisie) and workers; however, the coalitions did not hold together for long. Many of the revolutions were quickly suppressed, as tens of thousands of people were killed, and even more were forced into exile. Significant lasting reforms included the abolition of serfdom in Austria and Hungary, the end of absolute monarchy in Denmark, and the introduction of representative democracy in the Netherlands. The revolutions were most important in France, the Netherlands, Italy, the Austrian Empire, and the states of the German Confederation that would make up the German Empire in the late 19th and early 20th centuries. Although the United Kingdom did not see any notable actions at home, in British Ceylon there was a parallel but unsuccessful uprising against British rule known as the Matale Rebellion. The wave of uprisings ended in October 1849.

Origins

The revolutions arose from such a wide variety of causes that it is difficult to view them as resulting from a coherent movement or set of social phenomena. Numerous changes had been taking place in European society throughout the first half of the 19th century. Both liberal reformers and radical politicians were reshaping national governments.

Technological change was revolutionizing the life of the working classes. A popular press extended political awareness, and new values and ideas such as popular liberalism, nationalism and socialism began to emerge. Some historians emphasize the serious crop failures, particularly those of 1846, that produced hardship among peasants and the working urban poor.

Large swaths of the nobility were discontented with royal absolutism or near-absolutism. In 1846, there had been an uprising of Polish nobility in Austrian Galicia, which was only countered when peasants, in turn, rose up against the nobles. Additionally, an uprising by democratic forces against Prussia, planned but not actually carried out, occurred in Greater Poland.

The middle and working classes thus shared a desire for reform, and agreed on many of the specific aims. Their participation in the revolutions, however, differed. While much of the impetus came from the middle classes, the physical backbone of the movement came from the lower classes. The revolts first erupted in the cities.

Urban workers

The population in French rural areas had risen rapidly, causing many peasants to seek a living in the cities. Many in the bourgeoisie feared and distanced themselves from the working poor. Many unskilled laborers toiled from 12 to 15 hours per day when they had work, living in squalid, disease-ridden slums. Traditional artisans felt the pressure of industrialization, having lost their guilds.

The liberalization of trade laws and the growth of factories had increased the gulf between master tradesmen, and journeymen and apprentices, whose numbers increased disproportionately by 93% from 1815 to 1848 in Germany. Significant proletarian unrest had occurred in Lyon in 1831 and 1834, and Prague in 1844. Jonathan Sperber has suggested that in the period after 1825, poorer urban workers (particularly day laborers, factory workers and artisans) saw their purchasing power decline relatively steeply: urban meat consumption in Belgium, France and Germany stagnated or declined after 1830, despite growing populations. The economic Panic of 1847 increased urban unemployment: 10,000 Viennese factory workers lost jobs, and 128 Hamburg firms went bankrupt over the course of 1847. With the exception of the Netherlands, there was a strong correlation among the countries that were most deeply affected by the industrial shock of 1847 and those that underwent a revolution in 1848.

The situation in the German states was similar. Parts of Prussia were beginning to industrialize. During the decade of the 1840s, mechanized production in the textile industry brought about inexpensive clothing that undercut the handmade products of German tailors. Reforms ameliorated the most unpopular features of rural feudalism, but industrial workers remained dissatisfied with these reforms and pressed for greater change.

Urban workers had no choice but to spend half of their income on food, which consisted mostly of bread and potatoes. As a result of harvest failures, food prices soared and the demand for manufactured goods decreased, causing an increase in unemployment. During the revolution, to address the problem of unemployment, workshops were organized for men interested in construction work. Officials also set up workshops for women when they felt they were excluded. Artisans and unemployed workers destroyed industrial machines when they threatened to give employers more power over them.

Rural areas
Rural population growth had led to food shortages, land pressure, and migration, both within and from Europe, especially to the Americas. Peasant discontent in the 1840s grew in intensity. Peasant occupations of lost communal land increased in many areas; those convicted of wood theft in the Rhenish Palatinate increased from 100,000 in 1829–30 to 185,000 in 1846–47. In the years 1845 and 1846, a potato blight caused a subsistence crisis in Northern Europe, and encouraged the raiding of manorial potato stocks in Silesia in 1847. The effects of the blight were most severely manifested in the Great Irish Famine, but also caused famine-like conditions in the Scottish Highlands and throughout continental Europe. Harvests of rye in the Rhineland were 20% of previous levels, while the Czech potato harvest was reduced by half. These reduced harvests were accompanied by a steep rise in prices (the cost of wheat more than doubled in France and Habsburg Italy). There were 400 French food riots during 1846 to 1847, while German socio-economic protests increased from 28 during 1830 to 1839, to 103 during 1840 to 1847. Central to long-term peasant grievances were the loss of communal lands, forest restrictions (such as the French Forest Code of 1827), and remaining feudal structures, notably the robot (labor obligations) that existed among the serfs and oppressed peasantry of the Habsburg lands.

Aristocratic wealth (and corresponding power) was synonymous with the ownership of farm lands and effective control over the peasants. Peasant grievances exploded during the revolutionary year of 1848, yet were often disconnected from urban revolutionary movements: the revolutionary Sándor Petőfi's popular nationalist rhetoric in Budapest did not translate into any success with the Magyar peasantry, while the Viennese democrat Hans Kudlich reported that his efforts to galvanize the Austrian peasantry had "disappeared in the great sea of indifference and phlegm".

Role of ideas

Despite forceful and often violent efforts of established and reactionary powers to keep them down, disruptive ideas gained popularity: democracy, liberalism, radicalism, nationalism, and socialism. They demanded a constitution, universal manhood suffrage, press freedom, freedom of expression and other democratic rights, the establishment of civilian militia, liberation of peasants, liberalization of the economy, abolition of tariff barriers and the abolition of monarchical power structures in favour of the establishment of republican states, or at least the restriction of the prince power in the form of constitutional monarchies.

In the language of the 1840s, 'democracy' meant replacing an electorate of property-owners with universal male suffrage. 'Liberalism' fundamentally meant consent of the governed, restriction of church and state power, republican government, freedom of the press and the individual. The 1840s had seen the emergence of radical liberal publications such as Rheinische Zeitung (1842); Le National and La Réforme (1843) in France; Ignaz Kuranda's Grenzboten (1841) in Austria; Lajos Kossuth's Pesti Hírlap (1841) in Hungary, as well as the increased popularity of the older Morgenbladet in Norway and the Aftonbladet in Sweden.

'Nationalism' believed in uniting people bound by (some mix of) common languages, culture, religion, shared history, and of course immediate geography; there were also irredentist movements. Nationalism had developed a broader appeal during the pre-1848 period, as seen in the František Palacký's 1836 History of the Czech Nation, which emphasised a national lineage of conflict with the Germans, or the popular patriotic Liederkranz (song-circles) that were held across Germany: patriotic and belligerent songs about Schleswig had dominated the Würzburg national song festival in 1845.

'Socialism' in the 1840s was a term without a consensus definition, meaning different things to different people, but was typically used within a context of more power for workers in a system based on worker ownership of the means of production.

These concepts together - democracy, liberalism, nationalism and socialism, in the sense described above - came to be encapsulated in the political term radicalism.

Sequence of main trends 
Every country had a distinctive timing, but the general pattern showed very sharp cycles as reform moved up then down.

Spring 1848: Astonishing success

The world was astonished in spring 1848 when revolutions appeared in so many places and seemed on the verge of success everywhere. Agitators who had been exiled by the old governments rushed home to seize the moment. In France, the monarchy was once again overthrown and replaced by a republic. In a number of major German and Italian states, and in Austria, the old leaders were forced to grant liberal constitutions. The Italian and German states seemed to be rapidly forming unified nations. Austria gave Hungarians and Czechs liberal grants of autonomy and national status.

Summer 1848: Divisions among reformers
In France, bloody street battles exploded between the middle class reformers and the working class radicals. German reformers argued endlessly without finalizing their results.

Autumn 1848: Reactionaries organize for a counter-revolution
Caught off guard at first, the aristocracy and their allies plot a return to power.

1849–1851: Overthrow of revolutionary regimes
The revolutions suffer a series of defeats in summer 1849. Reactionaries returned to power and many leaders of the revolution went into exile. Some social reforms proved permanent, and years later nationalists in Germany, Italy, and Hungary gained their objectives.

Events by country or region

Italian states

Although few noticed at the time, the first major outbreak came in Palermo, Sicily, starting in January 1848. There had been several previous revolts against Bourbon rule; this one produced an independent state that lasted only 16 months before the Bourbons came back. During those months, the constitution was quite advanced for its time in liberal democratic terms, as was the proposal of an Italian confederation of states. The revolt's failure was reversed 12 years later as the Bourbon Kingdom of the Two Sicilies collapsed in 1860–61 with the Risorgimento.

France

The "February Revolution" in France was sparked by the suppression of the campagne des banquets. This revolution was driven by nationalist and republican ideals among the French general public, who believed the people should rule themselves. It ended the constitutional monarchy of Louis-Philippe, and led to the creation of the French Second Republic. After an interim period, Louis-Napoleon, the nephew of Napoleon Bonaparte, was elected as president. In 1852, he staged a coup d'état and established himself as a dictatorial emperor of the Second French Empire.

Alexis de Tocqueville remarked in his Recollections of the period, "society was cut in two: those who had nothing united in common envy, and those who had anything united in common terror."

German states

The "March Revolution" in the German states took place in the south and the west of Germany, with large popular assemblies and mass demonstrations. Led by well-educated students and intellectuals, they demanded German national unity, freedom of the press, and freedom of assembly. The uprisings were poorly coordinated, but had in common a rejection of traditional, autocratic political structures in the 39 independent states of the German Confederation. The middle-class and working-class components of the Revolution split, and in the end, the conservative aristocracy defeated it, forcing many liberal Forty-Eighters into exile.

Denmark

Denmark had been governed by a system of absolute monarchy (King's Law) since the 17th century. King Christian VIII, a moderate reformer but still an absolutist, died in January 1848 during a period of rising opposition from farmers and liberals. The demands for constitutional monarchy, led by the National Liberals, ended with a popular march to Christiansborg on 21 March. The new king, Frederick VII, met the liberals' demands and installed a new Cabinet that included prominent leaders of the National Liberal Party.

The national-liberal movement wanted to abolish absolutism, but retain a strongly centralized state. The king accepted a new constitution agreeing to share power with a bicameral parliament called the Rigsdag. It is said that the Danish king's first words after signing away his absolute power were, "that was nice, now I can sleep in the mornings". Although army officers were dissatisfied, they accepted the new arrangement which, in contrast to the rest of Europe, was not overturned by reactionaries. The liberal constitution did not extend to Schleswig, leaving the Schleswig-Holstein Question unanswered.

Schleswig

The Duchy of Schleswig, a region containing both Danes (a North Germanic population) and Germans (a West Germanic population), was a part of the Danish monarchy, but remained a duchy separate from the Kingdom of Denmark. Spurred by pan-German sentiment, the Germans of Schleswig took up arms in protest at a new policy announced by Denmark's National Liberal government which would have fully integrated the duchy into Denmark.

The German population in Schleswig and Holstein revolted, inspired by the Protestant clergy. The German states sent in an army, but Danish victories in 1849 led to the Treaty of Berlin (1850) and the London Protocol (1852). They reaffirmed the sovereignty of the King of Denmark, while prohibiting union with Denmark. The violation of the latter provision led to renewed warfare in 1863 and the Prussian victory in 1864.

Habsburg Monarchy

From March 1848 through July 1849, the Habsburg Austrian Empire was threatened by revolutionary movements, which often had a nationalist character. The empire, ruled from Vienna, included Germans, Austrians, Hungarians, Slovenes, Poles, Czechs, Croats, Slovaks, Ukrainians/Ruthenians, Romanians, Serbs and Italians, all of whom attempted in the course of the revolution to achieve either autonomy, independence, or even hegemony over other nationalities. The nationalist picture was further complicated by the simultaneous events in the German states, which moved toward greater German national unity.

Hungary

The Hungarian revolution of 1848 was the longest in Europe, crushed in August 1849 by Austrian and Russian armies. Nevertheless, it had a major effect in freeing the serfs. It started on 15 March 1848, when Hungarian patriots organized mass demonstrations in Pest and Buda (today Budapest) which forced the imperial governor to accept their 12 points of demands, which included the demand for freedom of press, an independent Hungarian ministry residing in Buda-Pest and responsible to a popularly elected parliament, the formation of a National Guard, complete civil and religious equality, trial by jury, a national bank, a Hungarian army, the withdrawal of foreign (Austrian) troops from Hungary, the freeing of political prisoners, and the union with Transylvania. On that morning, the demands were read aloud along with poetry by Sándor Petőfi with the simple lines of "We swear by the God of the Hungarians. We swear, we shall be slaves no more". Lajos Kossuth and some other liberal nobility that made up the Diet appealed to the Habsburg court with demands for representative government and civil liberties. These events resulted in Klemens von Metternich, the Austrian prince and foreign minister, resigning. The demands of the Diet were agreed upon on 18 March by Emperor Ferdinand. Although Hungary would remain part of the monarchy through personal union with the emperor, a constitutional government would be founded. The Diet then passed the April laws that established equality before the law, a legislature, a hereditary constitutional monarchy, and an end to the transfer and restrictions of land use.

The revolution grew into a war for independence from the Habsburg monarchy when Josip Jelačić, Ban of Croatia, crossed the border to restore their control. The new government, led by Lajos Kossuth, was initially successful against the Habsburg forces. Although Hungary took a national united stand for its freedom, some minorities of the Kingdom of Hungary, including the Serbs of Vojvodina, the Romanians of Transylvania and some Slovaks of Upper Hungary supported the Habsburg Emperor and fought against the Hungarian Revolutionary Army. Eventually, after one and a half years of fighting, the revolution was crushed when Russian Tsar Nicholas I marched into Hungary with over 300,000 troops. As result of the defeat, Hungary was thus placed under brutal martial law. The leading rebels like Kossuth fled into exile or were executed. In the long run, the passive resistance following the revolution, along with the crushing Austrian defeat in the 1866 Austro-Prussian War, led to the Austro-Hungarian Compromise (1867), which marked the birth of the Austro-Hungarian Empire.

Galicia
The center of the Ukrainian national movement was in Galicia, which is today divided between Ukraine and Poland. On 19 April 1848, a group of representatives led by the Greek Catholic clergy launched a petition to the Austrian Emperor. It expressed wishes that in those regions of Galicia where the Ruthenian (Ukrainian) population represented the majority, the Ukrainian language should be taught at schools and used to announce official decrees for the peasantry; local officials were expected to understand it and the Ruthenian clergy was to be equalized in their rights with the clergy of all other denominations.

On 2 May 1848, the Supreme Ruthenian Council was established. The council (1848–1851) was headed by the Greek-Catholic Bishop Gregory Yakhimovich and consisted of 30 permanent members. Its main goal was the administrative division of Galicia into Western (Polish) and Eastern (Ruthenian/Ukrainian) parts within the borders of the Habsburg Empire, and formation of a separate region with a political self-governance.

Sweden

During 18–19 March, a series of riots known as the March Unrest (Marsoroligheterna) took place in the Swedish capital of Stockholm. Declarations with demands of political reform were spread in the city and a crowd was dispersed by the military, leading to 18 casualties.

Switzerland

Switzerland, already an alliance of republics, also saw an internal struggle. The attempted secession of seven Catholic cantons to form an alliance known as the Sonderbund ("separate alliance") in 1845 led to a short civil conflict in November 1847 in which around 100 people were killed. The Sonderbund was decisively defeated by the Protestant cantons, which had a larger population. A new constitution of 1848 ended the almost-complete independence of the cantons, transforming Switzerland into a federal state.

Greater Poland

Polish people mounted a military insurrection against the Prussians in the Grand Duchy of Posen (or the Greater Poland region), a part of Prussia since its annexation in 1815. The Poles tried to establish a Polish political entity, but refused to cooperate with the Germans and the Jews. The Germans decided they were better off with the status quo, so they assisted the Prussian governments in recapturing control. In the long-term, the uprising stimulated nationalism among both the Poles and the Germans and brought civil equality to the Jews.

Romanian Principalities

A Romanian liberal and Romantic nationalist uprising began in June in the principality of Wallachia. Its goals were administrative autonomy, abolition of serfdom, and popular self-determination. It was closely connected with the 1848 unsuccessful revolt in Moldavia, it sought to overturn the administration imposed by Imperial Russian authorities under the Regulamentul Organic regime, and, through many of its leaders, demanded the abolition of boyar privilege. Led by a group of young intellectuals and officers in the Wallachian military forces, the movement succeeded in toppling the ruling Prince Gheorghe Bibescu, whom it replaced with a provisional government and a regency, and in passing a series of major liberal reforms, first announced in the Proclamation of Islaz.

Despite its rapid gains and popular backing, the new administration was marked by conflicts between the radical wing and more conservative forces, especially over the issue of land reform. Two successive abortive coups weakened the new government, and its international status was always contested by Russia. After managing to rally a degree of sympathy from Ottoman political leaders, the Revolution was ultimately isolated by the intervention of Russian diplomats. In September 1848 by agreement with the Ottomans, Russia invaded and put down the revolution. According to Vasile Maciu, the failures were attributable in Wallachia to foreign intervention, in Moldavia to the opposition of the feudalists, and in Transylvania to the failure of the campaigns of General Józef Bem, and later to Austrian repression. In later decades, the rebels returned and gained their goals.

Belgium

Belgium did not see major unrest in 1848; it had already undergone a liberal reform after the Revolution of 1830 and thus its constitutional system and its monarchy survived.

A number of small local riots broke out, concentrated in the sillon industriel industrial region of the provinces of Liège and Hainaut.

The most serious threat of revolutionary contagion, however, was posed by Belgian émigré groups from France. In 1830 the Belgian Revolution had broken out inspired by the revolution occurring in France, and Belgian authorities feared that a similar 'copycat' phenomenon might occur in 1848. Shortly after the revolution in France, Belgian migrant workers living in Paris were encouraged to return to Belgium to overthrow the monarchy and establish a republic. Belgian authorities expelled Karl Marx himself from Brussels in early March on accusations of having used part of his inheritance to arm Belgian revolutionaries.

Around 6,000 armed émigrés of the "Belgian Legion" attempted to cross the Belgian frontier. There were two divisions which were formed. The first group, travelling by train, were stopped and quickly disarmed at Quiévrain on 26 March 1848. The second group crossed the border on 29 March and headed for Brussels. They were confronted by Belgian troops at the hamlet of Risquons-Tout and defeated. Several smaller groups managed to infiltrate Belgium, but the reinforced Belgian border troops succeeded and the defeat at Risquons-Tout effectively ended the revolutionary threat to Belgium.

The situation in Belgium began to recover that summer after a good harvest, and fresh elections returned a strong majority to the governing party.

Ireland

A tendency common in the revolutionary movements of 1848 was a perception that the liberal monarchies set up in the 1830s, despite formally being representative parliamentary democracies, were too oligarchical and/or corrupt to respond to the urgent needs of the people, and were therefore in need of drastic democratic overhaul or, failing that, separatism to build a democratic state from scratch. This was the process that occurred in Ireland between 1801 and 1848.

Previously a separate kingdom, Ireland was incorporated into the United Kingdom in 1801. Although its population was made up largely of Catholics, and sociologically of agricultural workers, tensions arose from the political over-representation, in positions of power, of landowners of Protestant background who were loyal to the United Kingdom. From the 1810s a conservative-liberal movement led by Daniel O'Connell had sought to secure equal political rights for Catholics within the British political system, successful in the Roman Catholic Relief Act 1829. But as in other European states, a current inspired by Radicalism criticized the conservative-liberals for pursuing the aim of democratic equality with excessive compromise and gradualism.

In Ireland a current of nationalist, egalitarian and Radical republicanism, inspired by the French Revolution, had been present since the 1790s being expressed initially in the Irish Rebellion of 1798. This tendency grew into a movement for social, cultural and political reform during the 1830s, and in 1839 was realized into a political association called Young Ireland. It was initially not well received, but grew more popular with the Great Famine of 18451849, an event that brought catastrophic social effects and which threw into light the inadequate response of authorities.

The spark for the Young Irelander Revolution came in 1848 when the British Parliament passed the "Crime and Outrage Bill". The Bill was essentially a declaration of martial law in Ireland, designed to create a counter-insurgency against the growing Irish nationalist movement.

In response, the Young Ireland Party launched its rebellion in July 1848, gathering landlords and tenants to its cause.

But its first major engagement against police, in the village of Ballingarry, South Tipperary, was a failure. A long gunfight with around 50 armed police ended when police reinforcements arrived. After the arrest of the Young Ireland leaders, the rebellion collapsed, though intermittent fighting continued for the next year,

It is sometimes called the Famine Rebellion (since it took place during the Great Famine).

Spain 
While no revolution occurred in Spain in the year 1848, a similar phenomenon occurred. During this year, the country was going through the Second Carlist War. The European revolutions erupted at a moment when the political regime in Spain faced great criticism from within one of its two main parties, and by 1854 a radical-liberal revolution and a conservative-liberal counter-revolution had both occurred.

Since 1833, Spain had been governed by a conservative-liberal parliamentary monarchy similar to and modelled on the July Monarchy in France. In order to exclude absolute monarchists from government, power had alternated between two liberal parties: the center-left Progressive Party, and the center-right Moderate Party. But a decade of rule by the center-right Moderates had recently produced a constitutional reform (1845), prompting fears that the Moderates sought to reach out to Absolutists and permanently exclude the Progressives. The left-wing of the Progressive Party, which had historical links to Jacobinism and Radicalism, began to push for root-and-branch reforms to the constitutional monarchy, notably universal male suffrage and parliamentary sovereignty.

The European Revolutions of 1848 and particularly the French Second Republic prompted the Spanish radical movement to adopt positions incompatible with the existing constitutional regime, notably republicanism. This ultimately led the Radicals to exit the Progressive Party to form the Democratic Party in 1849.

Over the next years, two revolutions occurred. In 1854, the conservatives of the Moderate Party were ousted after a decade in power by an alliance of Radicals, Liberals and liberal Conservatives led by Generals Espartero and O'Donnell. In 1856, the more conservative half of this alliance launched a second revolution to oust the republican Radicals, leading to a new 10-year period of government by conservative-liberal monarchists.

Taken together, the two revolutions can be thought of as echoing aspects of the French Second Republic: the Spanish Revolution of 1854, as a revolt by Radicals and Liberals against the oligarchical, conservative-liberal parliamentary monarchy of the 1830s, mirrored the French Revolution of 1848; while the Spanish Revolution of 1856, as a counter-revolution of conservative-liberals under a military strongman, had echoes of Louis-Napoléon Bonaparte's coup against the French Second Republic.

Other European states

Great Britain, Belgium, the Netherlands, Portugal, the Russian Empire (including Poland and Finland), and the Ottoman Empire did not encounter major national or Radical revolutions in 1848. Sweden and Norway were also little affected. Serbia, though formally unaffected by the revolt as it was a part of the Ottoman state, actively supported Serbian revolutionaries in the Habsburg Empire.

In some countries, uprisings had already occurred demanding similar reforms to the Revolutions of 1848, but little success. This was the case for the Kingdom of Poland and the Grand Duchy of Lithuania, which had seen a series of uprisings before or after but not during 1848: the November Uprising of 1830–31; the Kraków Uprising of 1846 (notable for being quelled by the anti-revolutionary Galician slaughter), and later on the January Uprising of 1863–65.

In other countries, the relative calm could be attributed to the fact that they had already gone through revolutions or civil wars in the preceding years, and therefore already enjoyed many of the reforms which Radicals elsewhere were demanding in 1848. This was largely the case for Belgium (the Belgian Revolution in 1830–1); Portugal (the large Liberal Wars of 1828–1834, and the minor civil war of Patuleia in 1846–1847); and Switzerland (the Sonderbund War of 1847)

In yet other countries, the absence of unrest was partly due to governments taking action to prevent revolutionary unrest, and pre-emptively grant some of the reforms demanded by revolutionaries elsewhere. This was notably the case for the Netherlands, where King William II decided to alter the Dutch constitution to reform elections and voluntarily reduce the power of the monarchy. The same might be said of Switzerland, where a new constitutional regime was introduced in 1848: the Swiss Federal Constitution was a revolution of sorts, laying the foundation of Swiss society as it is today.

While no major political upheavals occurred in the Ottoman Empire as such, political unrest did occur in some of its vassal states. In Serbia, feudalism was abolished and the power of the Serbian prince was reduced with the Constitution of Serbia in 1838.

Other English-speaking countries

In Britain, while the middle classes had been pacified by their inclusion in the extension of the franchise in the Reform Act 1832, the consequential agitations, violence, and petitions of the Chartist movement came to a head with their peaceful petition to Parliament of 1848. The repeal in 1846 of the protectionist agricultural tariffscalled the "Corn Laws"had defused some proletarian fervour.

In the Isle of Man, there were ongoing efforts to reform the self-elected House of Keys, but no revolution took place. Some of the reformers were encouraged by events in France in particular.

In the United States, opinions were polarized, with Democrats and reformers in favour, although they were distressed at the degree of violence involved. Opposition came from conservative elements, especially Whigs, southern slaveholders, orthodox Calvinists, and Catholics. About 4,000 German exiles arrived and some became fervent Republicans in the 1850s, such as Carl Schurz. Kossuth toured America and won great applause, but no volunteers or diplomatic or financial help.

Following rebellions in 1837 and 1838, 1848 in Canada saw the establishment of responsible government in Nova Scotia and The Canadas, the first such governments in the British Empire outside Great Britain. John Ralston Saul has argued that this development is tied to the revolutions in Europe, but described the Canadian approach to the revolutionary year of 1848 as "talking their way...out of the empire's control system and into a new democratic model", a stable democratic system which has lasted to the present day. Tory and Orange Order in Canada opposition to responsible government came to a head in riots triggered by the Rebellion Losses Bill in 1849. They succeeded in the burning of the Parliament Buildings in Montreal, but, unlike their counterrevolutionary counterparts in Europe, they were ultimately unsuccessful.

Latin America
In Spanish Latin America, the Revolution of 1848 appeared in New Granada, where Colombian students, liberals, and intellectuals demanded the election of General José Hilario López. He took power in 1849 and launched major reforms, abolishing slavery and the death penalty, and providing freedom of the press and of religion. The resulting turmoil in Colombia lasted three decades; from 1851 to 1885, the country was ravaged by four general civil wars and 50 local revolutions.

In Chile, the 1848 revolutions inspired the 1851 Chilean Revolution.

In Brazil, the Praieira Revolt, a movement in Pernambuco, lasted from November 1848 to 1852. Unresolved conflicts from the period of the regency and local resistance to the consolidation of the Brazilian Empire that had been proclaimed in 1822 helped to plant the seeds of the revolution.

In Mexico, the conservative government led by Santa Anna lost California and half of the territory to the United States in the Mexican–American War of 1845–1848. Derived from this catastrophe and chronic stability problems, the Liberal Party started a reformist movement. This movement, via elections, led liberals to formulate the Plan of Ayutla. The Plan written in 1854 aimed at removing conservative, centralist President Antonio López de Santa Anna from control of Mexico during the Second Federal Republic of Mexico period. Initially, it seemed little different from other political plans of the era, but it is considered the first act of the Liberal Reform in Mexico. It was the catalyst for revolts in many parts of Mexico, which led to the resignation of Santa Anna from the presidency, never to vie for office again. The next Presidents of Mexico were the liberals, Juan Álvarez, Ignacio Comonfort, and Benito Juárez. The new regime would then proclaim the 1857 Mexican Constitution, which implemented a variety of liberal reforms. Among other things, these reforms confiscated religious property, aimed to promote economic development and to stabilize a nascent republican government. The reforms led directly to the so-called Three Years War or Reform War of 1857. The liberals won this war but the conservatives solicited the French Government of Napoleon III for a European, conservative Monarch, deriving into the Second French intervention in Mexico. Under the puppet Habsburg government of Maximilian I of Mexico, the country became a client state of France (1863-1867).

Legacy

Historian Priscilla Robertson posits that many goals were achieved by the 1870s, but the credit primarily goes to the enemies of the 1848 revolutionaries, commenting: "Most of what the men of 1848 fought for was brought about within a quarter of a century, and the men who accomplished it were most of them specific enemies of the 1848 movement. Thiers ushered in a third French Republic, Bismarck united Germany, and Cavour, Italy. Deák won autonomy for Hungary within a dual monarchy; a Russian czar freed the serfs; and the British manufacturing classes moved toward the freedoms of the People's Charter."

Liberal democrats looked to 1848 as a democratic revolution, which in the long run ensured liberty, equality, and fraternity. For nationalists, 1848 was the springtime of hope, when newly emerging nationalities rejected the old multinational empires, but the end results were not as comprehensive as many had hoped. Communists denounced 1848 as a betrayal of working-class ideals by a bourgeoisie indifferent to the legitimate demands of the proletariat. The view of the Revolutions of 1848 as a bourgeois revolution is also common in non-Marxist scholarship. Middle-class anxiety and different approaches between bourgeois revolutionaries and radicals led to the failure of revolutions. Many governments engaged in a partial reversal of the revolutionary reforms of 1848–1849 as well as heightened repression and censorship. The Hanoverian nobility successfully appealed to the Confederal Diet in 1851 over the loss of their noble privileges, while the Prussian Junkers recovered their manorial police powers from 1852 to 1855. In the Austrian Empire, the Sylvester Patents (1851) discarded Franz Stadion's constitution and the Statute of Basic Rights, while the number of arrests in Habsburg territories increased from 70,000 in 1850 to one million by 1854. Nicholas I's rule in Russia after 1848 was particularly repressive, marked by an expansion of the secret police (the Tretiye Otdeleniye) and stricter censorship; there were more Russians working for censorship organs than actual books published in the period immediately after 1848. In France, the works of Charles Baudelaire, Victor Hugo, Alexandre Ledru-Rollin, and Pierre-Joseph Proudhon were confiscated.

In the post-revolutionary decade after 1848, little had visibly changed, and many historians considered the revolutions a failure, given the seeming lack of permanent structural changes. More recently, Christopher Clark has characterised the period that followed 1848 as one dominated by a revolution in government. Karl Marx expressed disappointment at the bourgeois character of the revolutions. Marx elaborated in his 1850 "Address of the Central Committee to the Communist League" a theory of permanent revolution according to which the proletariat should strengthen democratic bourgeois revolutionary forces until the proletariat itself is ready to seize power.  The Prussian Prime Minister Otto von Manteuffel declared that the state could no longer be run like the landed estate of a nobleman. In Prussia, August von Bethmann-Hollweg's Preußisches Wochenblatt newspaper (founded 1851) acted as a popular outlet for modernising Prussian conservative statesmen and journalists against the reactionary Kreuzzeitung faction. The Revolutions of 1848 were followed by new centrist coalitions dominated by liberals nervous of the threat of working-class socialism, as seen in the Piedmontese Connubio under Camillo Benso, Count of Cavour.

Governments after 1848 were forced into managing the public sphere and popular sphere with more effectiveness, resulting in the increased prominence of the Prussian Zentralstelle für Pressangelegenheiten (Central Press Agency, established 1850), the Austrian Zensur-und polizeihofstelle, and the French Direction Générale de la Librairie (1856). Nevertheless, there were a few immediate successes for some revolutionary movements, notably in the Habsburg lands. Austria and Prussia eliminated feudalism by 1850, improving the lot of the peasants. European middle classes made political and economic gains over the next 20 years; France retained universal male suffrage. Russia would later free the serfs on 19 February 1861. The Habsburgs finally had to give the Hungarians more self-determination in the Ausgleich of 1867. The revolutions inspired lasting reform in Denmark as well as the Netherlands. Reinhard Rürup has described the 1848 Revolutions as a turning point in the development of modern antisemitism through the development of conspiracies that presented Jews as representative both of the forces of social revolution (apparently typified in Joseph Goldmark and Adolf Fischhof of Vienna) and of international capital, as seen in the 1848 report from Eduard von Müller-Tellering, the Viennese correspondent of Marx's Neue Rheinische Zeitung, which declared that "tyranny comes from money and the money belongs to the Jews".

About 4,000 exiles came to the United States fleeing the reactionary purges. Of these, 100 went to the Texas Hill Country as German Texans. More widely, many disillusioned and persecuted revolutionaries, in particular (though not exclusively) those from Germany and the Austrian Empire, left their homelands for foreign exile in the New World or in the more liberal European nations; these emigrants were known as the Forty-Eighters.

In popular culture 
Steven Brust and Emma Bull's 1997 epistolary novel Freedom & Necessity is set in England in the aftermath of the Revolutions of 1848.

See also

 Age of Revolution
 Arab Spring
 Colour Revolutions
 Protests of 1968
 Revolutions of 1830
 Revolutions of 1917–23
 Revolutions of 1989

References

Bibliography

Surveys
 Breunig, Charles (1977), The Age of Revolution and Reaction, 1789–1850
 Chastain, James, ed. (2005) Encyclopedia of Revolutions of 1848 online from Ohio State U.
 Dowe, Dieter, ed. Europe in 1848: Revolution and Reform (Berghahn Books, 2000)
 Evans, R. J. W., and Hartmut Pogge von Strandmann, eds. The Revolutions in Europe, 1848–1849: From Reform to Reaction (2000), 10 essays by scholars excerpt and text search
 Pouthas, Charles. "The Revolutions of 1848" in J. P. T. Bury, ed. New Cambridge Modern History: The Zenith of European Power 1830–70 (1960) pp. 389–415 online excerpts
 Langer, William. The Revolutions of 1848 (Harper, 1971), standard overview
 Political and social upheaval, 1832-1852 (1969), standard overview online
 Namier, Lewis. 1848: The Revolution of the Intellectuals (Doubleday Anchor Books, 1964), first published by the British Academy in 1944.
 Rapport, Mike (2009), 1848: Year of Revolution  online review, a standard survey
 Robertson, Priscilla (1952), Revolutions of 1848: A Social History, despite the subtitle this is a traditional political narrative
 Sperber, Jonathan. The European revolutions, 1848–1851 (1994) online edition
 Stearns, Peter N. The Revolutions of 1848 (1974). online edition
 Weyland, Kurt. "The Diffusion of Revolution: '1848' in Europe and Latin America", International Organization Vol. 63, No. 3 (Summer, 2009) pp. 391–423 .

France
 Clark, Timothy J. Image of the people: Gustave Courbet and the 1848 revolution (Univ of California Press, 1999), his paintings.
 Duveau, Georges. 1848: The Making of a Revolution (1966)
 Fasel, George. "The Wrong Revolution: French Republicanism in 1848," French Historical Studies Vol. 8, No. 4 (Autumn, 1974), pp. 654–77 in JSTOR
 Loubère, Leo. "The Emergence of the Extreme Left in Lower Languedoc, 1848–1851: Social and Economic Factors in Politics," American Historical Review (1968), v. 73#4 1019–51 in JSTOR
 Merriman, John M. The Agony of the Republic: The Repression of the Left in Revolutionary France, 1848-1851 (Yale UP, 1978).

Germany and Austria
 Deak, Istvan. The Lawful Revolution: Louis Kossuth and the Hungarians, 1848–1849 (1979)
 Hahs, Hans J. The 1848 Revolutions in German-speaking Europe (2001)
 Hamerow, Theodore S. "History and the German Revolution of 1848." American Historical Review 60.1 (1954): 27–44. online.
 Hewitson, Mark. "'The Old Forms are Breaking Up, ... Our New Germany is Rebuilding Itself': Constitutionalism, Nationalism and the Creation of a German Polity during the Revolutions of 1848–49," English Historical Review, Oct 2010, Vol. 125 Issue 516, pp. 1173–1214 online
 Macartney, C. A. "1848 in the Habsburg Monarchy," European Studies Review, 1977, Vol. 7 Issue 3, pp. 285–309 online
 O'Boyle Lenore. "The Democratic Left in Germany, 1848," Journal of Modern History Vol. 33, No. 4 (Dec. 1961), pp. 374–83 in JSTOR
 Robertson, Priscilla. Revolutions of 1848: A Social History (1952), pp 105–85 on Germany, pp. 187–307 on Austria
 Sked, Alan. The Survival of the Habsburg Empire: Radetzky, the Imperial Army and the Class War, 1848 (1979)
 Vick, Brian. Defining Germany The 1848 Frankfurt Parliamentarians and National Identity (Harvard University Press, 2002) .

Italy
 Ginsborg, Paul. "Peasants and Revolutionaries in Venice and the Veneto, 1848," Historical Journal, Sep 1974, Vol. 17 Issue 3, pp. 503–50 in JSTOR
 Ginsborg, Paul. Daniele Manin and the Venetian Revolution of 1848–49 (1979)
 Robertson, Priscilla (1952). Revolutions of 1848: A Social History (1952) pp. 309–401

Other
 Feyzioğlu, Hamiyet Sezer et al. "Revolutions of 1848 and the Ottoman Empire," Bulgarian Historical Review, 2009, Vol. 37 Issue 3/4, pp. 196–205

Historiography
 Dénes, Iván Zoltán. "Reinterpreting a 'Founding Father': Kossuth Images and Their Contexts, 1848–2009," East Central Europe, April 2010, Vol. 37 Issue 1, pp. 90–117
 Hamerow, Theodore S. "History and the German Revolution of 1848," American Historical Review Vol. 60, No. 1 (Oct. 1954), pp. 27–44 in JSTOR
 Jones, Peter (1981), The 1848 Revolutions (Seminar Studies in History)
 Mattheisen, Donald J. "History as Current Events: Recent Works on the German Revolution of 1848," American Historical Review, Dec 1983, Vol. 88 Issue 5, pp. 1219–37 in JSTOR
 Rothfels, Hans. "1848 – One Hundred Years After," Journal of Modern History, Dec 1948, Vol. 20 Issue 4, pp. 291–319 in JSTOR

External links

 "Encyclopedia of 1848 Revolutions" new articles by scholars
The Revolutions of 1848 begin
Maps of Europe showing the Revolutions of 1848–1849 at omniatlas.com

 
1848
1848
.Revolutions
1848 Revolutions
European political history
History of Central Europe
History of socialism
History of liberalism
Nationalist movements
Romanticism
Age of Revolution